Ignacio "Nacho" Arroyo Varela is a Chilean professional basketball player.

Club career  
Ever since Arroyo joined Movistar Estudiantes in 2017, he has been coached by Javier Zamora. In July 2020, Arroyo extended the contract with his team until 2023.

National team  
Arroyo has represented Chile at both senior and junior level. 

For both his country's U-15 team and U-17 team he won bronze at the South American Championship. At the 2017 FIBA South America Under-17 Championship he topped his previous performances by winning the gold medal.

References

External links
FIBA profile 
Profile at RealGM.com
Profile at Latinbasket.com

2000 births
Living people
Chilean expatriate basketball people in Spain
Chilean men's basketball players
People from Osorno, Chile
Point guards